Beta Virginis, a name Latinised from β Virginis, is a star in the equatorial constellation of Virgo. It has the proper name Zavijava, and, despite its designation 'beta', is the fifth-brightest star in Virgo with an apparent visual magnitude of 3.604. The distance to this star is 35.7 light-years based on parallax, and it is drifting further away with a radial velocity of +4.1 km/s. It is 0.69 of a degree north of the ecliptic, so it can be occulted by the Moon and (rarely) by planets. The next planetary occultation of Beta Virginis will take place on 11 August 2069, by Venus.

Properties 

This is an F-type main-sequence star with a stellar classification of F9 V, which means it is generating energy through core hydrogen fusion. Sun-like oscillations have been detected in Beta Virginis, allowing its internal structure to be modeled in more detail. It is around 2.9 billion years old with a projected rotational velocity of 4.3 km/s and appears to be near the end of its main sequence lifetime. Larger and more massive than the Sun, it is comparatively metal-rich (that is, it has a higher preponderance of elements heavier than helium).

According to Nelson & Angel (1998), Beta Virginis could host two or three jovian planets in wide orbits. The authors have set an upper limit of 1.9, 5 and 23 Jupiter masses for the putative planets with orbital periods of 15, 25 and 50 years, respectively. Also Campbell et al. 1988 inferred the existence of planetary objects or even brown dwarfs around Beta Virginis. However, more recent studies have not confirmed the existence of any substellar companion around Beta Virginis yet. McDonald Observatory team has set limits to the presence of one or more planets with masses between 0.16 and 4.2 Jupiter masses and average separations spanning between 0.05 and 5.2 astronomical units.

Nomenclature

β Virginis (Latinised to Beta Virginis) is the star's Bayer designation.

It bore the traditional names Zavijava (also Zavijah, Zavyava and Zawijah) and Alaraph. Zavijava is from the Arabic زاوية العواء zāwiyat al-cawwa’ 'corner of the barking (dog)'. In 2016, the International Astronomical Union organized a Working Group on Star Names (WGSN) to catalog and standardize proper names for stars. The WGSN approved the name Zavijava for this star on 21 August 2016 and it is now so entered in the IAU Catalog of Star Names.

References

External links
 
 

F-type main-sequence stars
Virginis, Beta
Virgo (constellation)
Virginis, Beta
Durchmusterung objects
Virginis, 005
0449
102870
057757
4540
Zavijava